All Star Racing 2 is a racing game for the PlayStation. It was developed by Kung Fu Games and published in North America by Mud Duck Productions and in Europe by Midas Interactive Entertainment. It is the sequel to All Star Racing.

Gameplay
The game contains multiple vehicles and five tracks. It also has multiple viewpoints and three levels of difficulty.

Reception
PSX Nation scored the game 59 out of 100 in June 2003.

References

2003 video games
Bethesda Softworks games
Multiplayer and single-player video games
PlayStation (console) games
PlayStation (console)-only games
Racing video games
Video games developed in the United Kingdom
Mud Duck Productions games